Ambleside railway station was located about 43.5 kilometres from Adelaide station, on the Adelaide-Wolseley line, in the Adelaide Hills suburb of Balhannah, at an elevation of 318 metres.

History
Ambleside was opened in November 1883, and was located just north of Ambleside Road. It was named Ambleside which was the alternate name for Hahndorf during WW1. The station consisted of a ticket office, and a large shelter, similar to the one at Balhannah. A smaller platform and shelter shed were provided.

The station wasn't in a convenient location for passengers, which led to its closure around 1965–66 as a result of the SAR's scaling down of services. There is no evidence of the station left, as the main platform and associated infrastructure were removed sometime after 1966, and the smaller platform (plus the shelter shed and signs) was removed in the 1980s-early 1990s.

In 2011-2013 a crossing loop was built to split the long distance between Belair and Mount Barker Junction.

References

 Callaghan WH. The overland railway. ARHS NSW, St James. 1992.

Disused railway stations in South Australia
Railway stations in Australia opened in 1883
1960s disestablishments in Australia
Railway stations closed in the 1960s